Igor Olegovich Lisovsky (born on 25 June 1954) is a former Soviet pair skater. With his then-wife Irina Vorobieva, he is the 1981 World champion and the 1981 European champion. They were coached by Tamara Moskvina.

He currently coaches in Missouri.

Programs 
(with Vorobieva)

Competitive highlights

With Vorobieva

With Skurikhina

Singles career

Coaching 
Lisovsky currently coaches at Brentwood Ice Arena in St. Louis, Missouri.  He has received the St. Louis Youth Coach of the Year award from the St. Louis Sports Commission.

References 
 New York Times: Soviet Streak in Pairs Ended by East Germans
 Pairs on Ice: Vorobieva & Lisovsky 
 Skatabase: 1980s Worlds
 Skatabase: 1980s Europeans

Navigation

Russian male pair skaters
Soviet male pair skaters
1954 births
Living people
World Figure Skating Championships medalists
European Figure Skating Championships medalists